A jet pack (or jetpack) is a jet-powered or rocket-powered device, usually worn on the back, that allows a person to fly.

Jetpack or Jetpac may also refer to:

Arts, entertainment, and media

Games
Jetpac, a ZX Spectrum videogame released in 1983 by Ultimate Play the Game
Jetpack (video game), an MS-DOS videogame released in 1993
Jetpack, a mobile Wi-Fi hotspot made by Verizon
Jetpack Joyride, a side-scrolling endless-running arcade video game published by Halfbrick Studios

Music
Jetpack UK, now The Nobility, a pop rock band
Jetpack (musician), a musician based in southern California
"Jetpack", a song by Flobots from Flobots Present... Platypus

Computing and technology
 JetPack, a Linux-based Software Development Kit (SDK) from Nvidia for their Jetson board series
 Jetpack, a plugin by WordPress.com
 jetpack.exe, a Microsoft Windows command-line utility used to compact a Jet Database
 Martin Jetpack, a personal ducted fan flying machine
 Mozilla Jetpack, a library and API being developed for extensions to the Firefox web browser
 Verizon Jetpack, a brand of mobile hotspot (Wi-Fi)

See also
 Jet (disambiguation)
 Pack (disambiguation)
 Pak (disambiguation)